= Mayowa Adegbile =

Nigerian Philanthropist

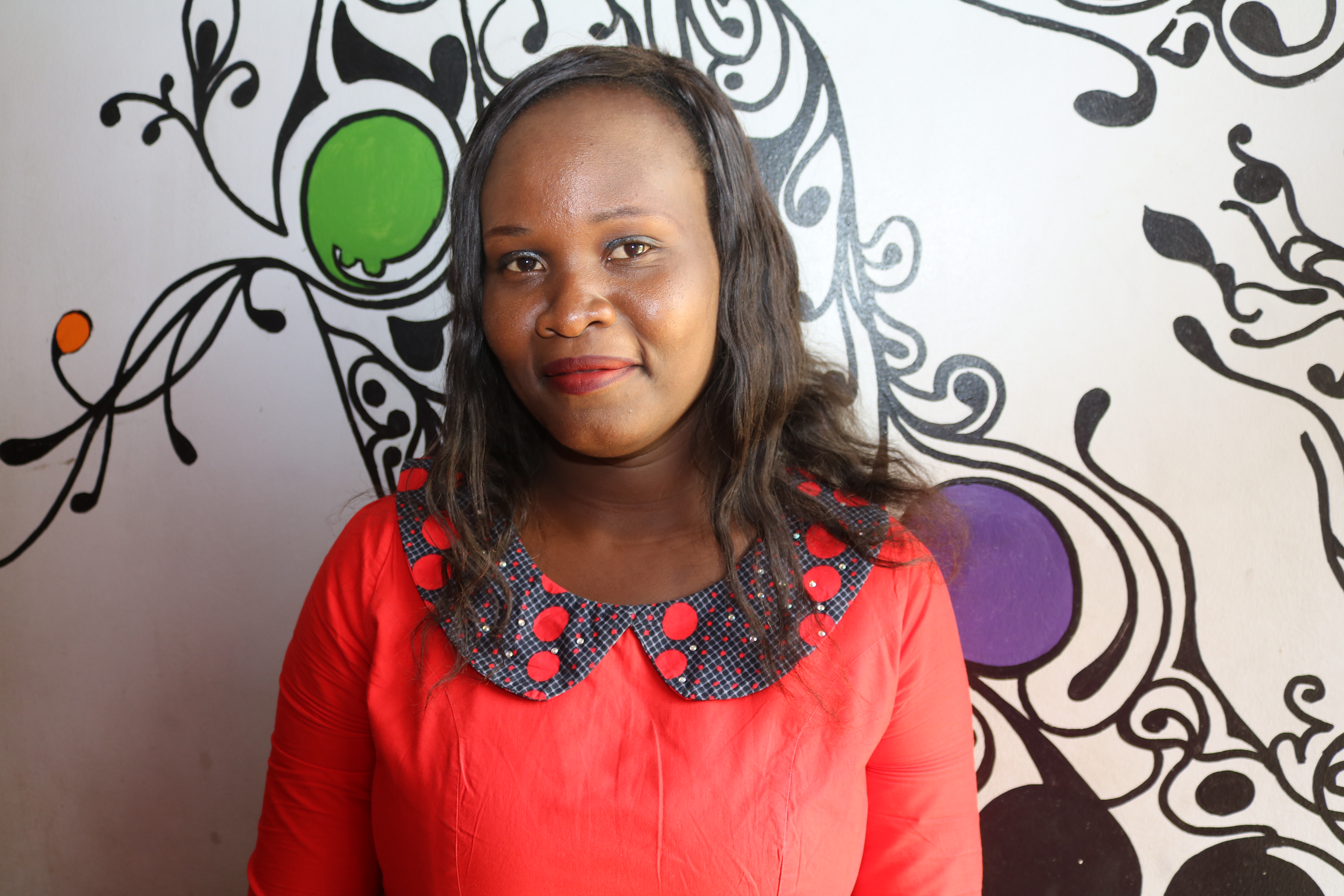
- Mayowa Adegbile in Abuja, Nigeria
- Born: Mayowa Abisola Adegbile; 10 September 1986 (age 40); Nigeria, Lagos
- Education: Enterprise Development Center Lagos Business School Social Sector Management Masters in Business Administration, European School of Management and Technology, Germany
- Occupations: Teacher, Social Sector Manager
- Website: ashakefoundation.com

Mayowa Adegbile (Mayowa Abisola Adegbile; born 10 September 1986) is a Nigerian Development Expert known for excelling as one of the three Nigerians that made it to the top 10 finalists in the year 2014 Google Africa Connected competition. Adegbile initially used YouTube to raise funds for her initiative, Ashake Foundation which she conceptualised as a business school for widowed mothers, giving them the tools to make a living and support their families.

== Ashake Foundation ==
Adegbile started the Ashake Foundation in 2013 with an initial number of 22 widows and 36 children and has helped provide business support funds and resources that has seen them lifted out of near-poverty while providing back-to-school support for the children.

== Awards ==
In July, 2017, Adegbile was awarded by the Junior Chamber International as one of ten Outstanding Young Persons of Nigeria for her work in Humanitarian and Voluntary Leadership.
